Nuvvekkadunte Nenakkadunta (translation: I will be there where you are) is a 2012 Telugu romance film starring  Uday Kiran and Shweta Prasad in the lead roles directed by Subha Selvam. The soundtrack of the film was composed by Pradeep Koneru and the audio was successfully released with positive reviews. The film was released on 20 April 2012. The film was released in Tamil as Oru Mutham Oru Yuddham.

Cast 
Uday Kiran as Hari
Shweta Prasad as Haritha 
Baby Annie as an orphan child
Aarthi as Nilambari
Ajith Kumar as Bhadra
Ashish Vidyarthi
Nizhalgal Ravi
 Brahmanandam as a hearing impaired advocate
Chitram Seenu
 AVS as a boss of a finance company
 Gundu Hanumantha Rao as priest
 Gundu Sudharshan
Tamil version
 Manobala as a boss of a finance company

Soundtrack 
Soundtrack was composed by Pradeep Koneru.
Uppenala Ningini - Ranjith
Manasaganannadi - Vedala Hemachandra, Geetha Madhuri
Jabili - Karthik
Kondalo Koyilamma -Sathish, Malavika
Suryachandrulaina - Anuradha Sriram

Reception
Times of India wrote "Director Shubha Selvam has tried hard to create suspense in the film, but his efforts only gets onto your nerves and only ends up creating more confusion". 123telugu wrote "Though having an interesting concept, director Selvam has failed miserably in executing it on the screen. None of the scenes are watchable".

References

External links
 http://www.idlebrain.com/news/functions/pressmeet-nuvvekkadunte.html

2012 films
2010s Telugu-language films
Indian romance films
2012 romance films